Rhynchopyga is a genus of moths in the subfamily Arctiinae.

Species
 Rhynchopyga albigutta Draudt, 1915
 Rhynchopyga bicolor Dognin
 Rhynchopyga braconida Kaye, 1911
 Rhynchopyga castra E. D. Jones, 1912
 Rhynchopyga discalba Kaye, 1918
 Rhynchopyga elongata Dognin, 1890
 Rhynchopyga flavicollis H. Druce, 1884
 Rhynchopyga garleppi Gaede, 1926
 Rhynchopyga hymenopteridia Rothschild, 1911
 Rhynchopyga ichneumonea Felder, 1869
 Rhynchopyga meisteri Berg, 1883
 Rhynchopyga metaphaea Hampson, 1898
 Rhynchopyga pimpla Draudt, 1915
 Rhynchopyga rubricincta Hampson, 1898
 Rhynchopyga semibrunnea Gaede, 1926
 Rhynchopyga semirufa H. Druce, 1906
 Rhynchopyga steniptera Hampson, 1909
 Rhynchopyga subflamma H. Druce, 1884
 Rhynchopyga xanthospila Hampson, 1898
 Rhynchopyga xanthozona Draudt, 1915

References

Euchromiina
Moth genera